Bling Kong was an indie rock band from New York City in early to mid 2000's. The band consisted of eleven members: three drummers, two guitarists, one bass guitar player, one videographer, and four cheerleaders. The band was known for their sexual, rock-driven, music with humorous lyrics, as well as their clothing line.

Discography
Greatest Hits 3.16.Ö3-5.20.Ö3 (2003) self-released
Do The Awesome (2005)

References

Musical groups from New York (state)
American indie rock groups